Chaichan Kiewsen (Thai ชายชาญ เขียวเสน) is a Thai former footballer. He scored 3 goals for the Thai national team, including a goal in the 1997 SEA Games Final, and participated in the 1998 AFF Championship.

International goals

References

Living people
Chaichan Kiewsen
Chaichan Kiewsen
Chaichan Kiewsen
Southeast Asian Games medalists in football
Association football forwards
Year of birth missing (living people)
Competitors at the 1997 Southeast Asian Games